Thymosin α1 is a peptide fragment derived from prothymosin alpha, a protein that in humans is encoded by the PTMA gene.

It was the first of the peptides from Thymosin Fraction 5 to be completely sequenced and synthesized. Unlike β thymosins, to which it is genetically and chemically unrelated, thymosin α1 is produced as a 28-amino acid fragment, from a longer, 113-amino acid precursor, prothymosin α.

Function 

Thymosin α1 is believed to be a major component of Thymosin Fraction 5 responsible for the activity of that preparation in restoring immune function in animals lacking thymus glands.   It has been found to enhance cell-mediated immunity in humans as well as experimental animals.

Therapeutic application 
 Thymosin α1 is approved in 35 under-developed or developing countries for the treatment of Hepatitis B and C, and it is also used to boost the immune response in the treatment of other diseases.

Clinical studies
Clinical trials suggest it may be useful in cystic fibrosis, septic shock, acute respiratory distress syndrome, peritonitis, acute cytomegalovirus infection, TB, severe acute respiratory syndrome, and lung infections in critically ill patients., and for chronic hepatitis B.

It has been studied for possible use in treating cancer (e.g. with chemotherapy).

See also
 Thymosins

References

Further reading

Hormones of the thymus gland
Peptides